The Grinager Mercantile Building on Main St. E. in Mayville, North Dakota was built in 1899.  It was a department store.  It was listed on the National Register of Historic Places in 1985.

See also
Inga B. Grinager House, also NRHP-listed in Mayville

References

Commercial buildings on the National Register of Historic Places in North Dakota
Gothic Revival architecture in North Dakota
Commercial buildings completed in 1899
Department stores on the National Register of Historic Places
1899 establishments in North Dakota
National Register of Historic Places in Traill County, North Dakota
Historic department store buildings in the United States
Mayville, North Dakota